Semillitas is an American Spanish-language children pay television channel, owned by the media company SomosTV, headed by Luis Villanueva (President & CEO of SOMOS Group). The channel targets children 0–5 years of age with the objective of preserving Hispanic cultural roots and language through entertaining and violence-free programming, specifically animation and is distributed in a format without traditional television advertisement. Semillitas, produced in High Definition, programs animation in Spanish 24-hours a day, with closed captioning and video description, utilizing Standard Spanish dialogue.

History 
In 2010, Semillitas was launched by Somos TV initially in The United States. Semillitas targets Hispanic toddlers and preschool aged children with the objective to entertain, educate and help preserve the language and cultural heritage. Semillitas programs violence-free and stop-motion animation content from Latin America and international markets. On October 24, 2011, Verizon FiOS added the channel on the lineup on position 1721. Semillitas has expanded its coverage internationally, with distribution to Central America, Panama and The Caribbean (Dominican Republic). in companies such as Claro and Millicom.

In 2019, Semillitas was nominated to the PROMAX Awards in the Total Package Design category.

In 2020, Semillitas celebrated its 10 years Anniversary.

Programming 
The programs shown on this channel include: 
Louie
Elías
Sid the Science Kid
The DoodlebopsAngelina BallerinaBob the BuilderChloe's ClosetFranny's FeetMoukClayPlayDive Olly Dive!Kit and KateFireman SamMonkey See, Monkey Do,The DoozersPocoyoStrawberry ShortcakeDr. PandaPirata & CapitanoQuiz TimeTickety Toc ChuggingtonBaliCaillouLittle People P. King DucklingBook Hungry BearsDumper & Skoop''

Semillitas includes multi-platform rights The channel is carried by cable television and Telco companies in the U.S, Panama, Dominican Republic and Central America and also affiliates part of the NCTC's (National Cable Television Cooperative). NCTC is responsible for acquiring programming and hardware for almost 1000 affiliated companies that own and operate cable television systems in the U.S. Semillitas offers its subscribers a Free VOD Service available in all its carriers.

Market 
Semillitas is currently available in the United States, Puerto Rico, Dominican Republic, Panama, Central America. and The Caribbean. The content of Semillitas has been selected within range of educational and entertaining programming for this age group. The programming emphasizes the relevance of culture and importance of family ties within the Hispanic community. Semillitas is currently available on Charter Spectrum, Liberty, RCN, Verizon FiOS, Blue Stream, Coyote Cable, Hargray, Tigo (Panama), Incateco and Tigo (Costa Rica, El Salvador, Honduras, y Guatemala), among other Pay Television providers.

References

External links 

http://www.somostv.net

Hispanic and Latino American culture in Miami
Spanish-language mass media in Florida
Spanish-language television networks in the United States
Companies based in Miami
Commercial-free television networks
Children's television networks in the United States
Television channels and stations established in 2006
Preschool education television networks